Target Zero is a 1955 American war and drama film directed by Harmon Jones and written by James Warner Bellah and Sam Rolfe.The film stars Richard Conte, Peggie Castle, Charles Bronson, Richard Wyler, L. Q. Jones and Chuck Connors. The film was released and published by Warner Bros. on November 15, 1955.

Plot
During a Korean War skirmish, a United Nations relief worker, Ann Galloway (Peggie Castle), is injured and her assistant killed after suffering enemy fire. As the Communist forces take over the region, she is rescued by a British patrol. Ann then hooks up with American troops led by Lt. Tom Flagler (Richard Conte), a soldier's soldier, admired by his men. Finding themselves behind enemy lines, they try to break through to rejoin Easy Company and other allied troops.

The British sergeant named Kensemmit (Richard Wyler) bears a grudge against all fellow soldiers and is particularly contemptuous of Flagler, as well as possibly interested in Ann romantically, though this latter point is never made clear and seems deliberately left unclear. SFC Vince Gaspari (Charles Bronson) vouches for Tom completely as a born leader, although he acknowledges Ann's conclusion that Tom cares about nothing else than his military duty to be true.  By contrast the other two British tank soldiers, Harry (pronounced "'arry" due to his working class accent) Fontenoy (Terence De Marney) and Cpt. Devon Enoch (John Alderson) both get along very well with the Americans, and in two scenes explicitly criticize Sgt. Kensemmit for his unnecessary hostile attitude.  During one scene Pvt. Geronimo, a Native American soldier (played by Abel Fernandez) from the Apache reservation in Arizona says to a southern-accented white American soldier that Native Americans were in this war so that they could get practice fighting for the eventual day when they reconquer the United States.  Pvt. Harry "'arry" Fontenoy says to the southern-accented GI "Don't worry mate, if they chuck you out, we'll take you back!" to which the southern-accented GI says "Thanks ole buddy, but the problem with that is I don't speak the language!"

On a scouting mission hoping to reconnect with "Sullivan's Muscle," Tom discovers that Easy Company has been massacred and their position in the line left open, leaving him bewildered. However, under orders to hold the line until help can arrive, and given air support and a naval bombardment support. They prepare defensive positions on the hill top and Tom and his men fight off North Korean foes. In the course of this Flagler and Kensemmit  reconcile their differences, with Kensemmit apologizing and saying that "I just woke up on the wrong side of the world this morning", to which Flagler replied, "No worries, you're a handy guy to have around" in reference to a previous scene in which Kensemmit's fighting abilities proved crucial to a victory against the communists.  In victory, Flagler and Kensemmit both come to realize that Ann represents the very kind of thing they have been fighting for all along.

Cast 
 Richard Conte as Lieutenant Tom Flagler
 Peggie Castle as Ann Galloway
 Charles Bronson as Sergeant First Class Vince Gaspari
 Richard Stapley as Sergeant David Kemsemmit 
 L. Q. Jones as Private Felix O'Hara
 Chuck Connors as Private "Moose"
 John Alderson as Corporal Devon Enoch
 Terence De Marney as Private Harry Fontenoy
 Strother Martin as Private Dan O'Hirons (uncredited)
 Aaron Spelling as Private Strangler (uncredited)
 Don Oreck as Private Stacey Della Nueva (uncredited)
 John Dennis as Private First Class George
 Angela Loo as Sue

Production
The F-80 Shooting Star aircraft were flown by the 120th Fighter Squadron of the Colorado Air National Guard. The film was shot at Fort Carson, Colorado and in Arizona.

Release
The film opened at the Paramount Theatre in New York City but only lasted 8 days with a gross of just $30,000.

References

External links
 
 
 
 

1955 films
Warner Bros. films
American war drama films
1955 drama films
Films directed by Harmon Jones
Films scored by David Buttolph
Korean War films
1950s English-language films
1950s American films
American black-and-white films